Governor Chafee may refer to:

John Chafee (1922–1999), 66th Governor of Rhode Island
Lincoln Chafee (born 1953), 74th Governor of Rhode Island